Aseptis ethnica is a moth of the family Noctuidae first described by John Bernhardt Smith in 1899. It is found in North America in Arizona, California, western Oregon, and Baja California Norte in Mexico. The habitat consists of open pine and oak forest and mountain chaparral, mostly at elevations of above 1500 meters in southern California but at lower elevations farther north.

The wingspan is 38–43.5 mm. Adults from southern California have dull grayish-tan forewings with a grainy appearance. In central and northern California and Oregon, it is dull deeper brown, sometimes with some reddish tones surrounding the dark-filled reniform and orbicular spots. Most adults are much less contrasting than Aseptis fumeola and lack its contrasting black-outlined spots, patchy dark shading, and reddish postreniform patch.
Adults are on wing in midsummer. Adults are on wing from early May to August.

The larvae feed on Arctostaphylos species.

References

External links

"Aseptis ethnica [Noctuidae]". Macromoths of Northwest Forests and Woodlands.

Moths described in 1899
Aseptis